The 2017 Philippine Basketball Association (PBA) Governors' Cup, also known as the 2017 Oppo-PBA Governors' Cup for sponsorship reasons, was the third and last conference of the 2016–17 PBA season. The tournament started on July 19 and ended on October 27, 2017.

Due to the FIBA Asia Cup, the league decided to temporarily shelve signing up Asian imports.

Format
The tournament format for this conference is as follows:
 Single-round robin eliminations; 11 games per team; Teams are then seeded by basis on win–loss records. 
Top eight teams will advance to the quarterfinals.  In case of tie, a playoff game will be held only for the #8 seed.
Quarterfinals (higher seed with the twice-to-beat advantage):
QF1: #1 seed vs #8 seed
QF2: #2 seed vs #7 seed
QF3: #3 seed vs #6 seed
QF4: #4 seed vs #5 seed
Semifinals (best-of-5 series):
SF1: QF1 vs. QF4 winners
SF2: QF2 vs. QF3 winners
Finals (best-of-7 series)
Winners of the semifinals

Elimination round

Team standings

Schedule

Results

Bracket

Quarterfinals

(1) Meralco vs. (8) Blackwater

(2) TNT vs. (7) Rain or Shine

(3) Barangay Ginebra vs. (6) San Miguel

(4) Star vs. (5) NLEX

Semifinals

(1) Meralco vs. (4) Star

(2) TNT vs. (3) Barangay Ginebra

Finals

Imports 
The following is the list of imports, which had played for their respective teams at least once, with the returning imports in italics. Highlighted in gold are the imports who stayed with their respective teams for the whole conference.

Awards

Conference
Best Player of the Conference: Greg Slaughter 
Bobby Parks Best Import of the Conference: Allen Durham

Players of the Week

References

PBA Governors' Cup
Governors' Cup